The Coastal Upland Swamps are critically endangered swamp areas scattered in the Sydney area and the Illawarra Escarpment which feature flora and fauna associated with sporadically marshy soils on the Hawkesbury sandstone plateaus. It occurs in the eastern Sydney area from the Somersby district in the north to Robertson in the south.

Geography
In the south, the community is present on the Woronora Plateau with shallow groundwater aquifers and in the north it is found on the Somersby-Hornsby Plateaus, where it occurs on impervious sandstone plateaus and acidic soils in the headwater valleys of watercourses, and on sandstone plateaus with plentiful flowing moisture and are related to weathered shale lenses and ironstone. They occur in damp areas, such as in the Illawarra escarpment, as the slope creates orographic rainfall, fog and increased cloud cover, which successively decreases evaporation.

The southern part of its spacing is detached from the north by an area of non-sandstone substrates, lower rainfall and lower elevation, and by the urban development of Sydney.

Ecology
Vegetation variety include open graminoid heath, sedge, closed scrubs, closed heaths, ferns, and tall scrub, in addition to microorganisms, fungi, and cryptogamic plants.

Animals
The Australian crayfish, hairy crayfish and Sydney crayfish are plenteous in the community, and as well as the Green and golden bell frog, Red-crowned toadlet, giant dragonfly and the giant burrowing frog. Other tetrapods include Wallabia bicolor, Varanus rosenbergi, Antechinus stuartii and Rattus lutreolus. Birds include Phylidonyris novaehollandiae, Stipiturus malachurus, Stagonopleura bella and Pezoporus wallicus.

References

Wetlands of New South Wales
Swamps of Australia
Landforms of New South Wales
Geography of Sydney
Endangered ecological communities
Vegetation of Australia
Ecoregions of New South Wales
Temperate grasslands, savannas, and shrublands